Danofloxacin is a fluoroquinolone antibiotic used in veterinary medicine.

References 

Fluoroquinolone antibiotics
Cyclopropanes
Veterinary drugs
Carboxylic acids